Class 51 may refer to:
Belgian Railways Class 51
DRG Class 51 a German class of steam freight locomotives
 Class 51.0: ČSD Class 623.0
 Class 51.7: Oldenburg G 1
 EAR 51 class - former KUR EC1 class
 LT&SR 51 Class